Angostura alipes is a species of plant in the family Rutaceae. It is endemic to Ecuador.

References

Flora of Ecuador
alipes
Vulnerable plants
Taxonomy articles created by Polbot